The 1985–86 Women's European Champions Cup was the 25th edition of the Europe's competition for national champions women's handball clubs, running between October 1985 and Spring 1986. Defending champion Spartak Kyiv defeated CS Stiinta Bacau in the final to win its eleventh title.

Quarter-finals

Round of 16

Quarter-finals

Semifinals

Final

References

Women's EHF Champions League
Ihf Women's European Cup, 1985-86
Ihf Women's European Cup, 1985-86
IHF
IHF